Gyon is a Chinese automobile manufacturer headquartered in Chengdu, China, that specializes in producing electric vehicles.

History
Gyon was founded in 2018 by Joe Chao, and is based in Chengdu. Gyon is a luxury car branch of the automotive company SiTech.

On August 8, 2018, Gyon announced a partnership with Gaffoglio Family Metalcrafters, a company based in Fountain Valley, California. Gyon plans to create vehicles with a charging time of 15 minutes. As of 2020, Gyon built a total of 5,000 electric charging stations around China. Gyon plans to launch 9 production vehicles from 2018 to 2026.

Gyon's concept vehicle, the Matchless Concept, was introduced at the 2019 Shanghai Auto Show. It includes the G-OS AI system. SAE Level 3 advanced driver assistance, G-Pilot, Autonomous Valet Parking (AVP), augmented reality heads-up display (AR-HUD), high-precision maps, AI assistance Viki, and a biometric system called GYON ID. Drivers can also search and reserve a charging spot with one click. It has also been shown in New York and Los Angeles.

Vehicles

Concept Models
Gyon has 1 concept vehicle.

See also
 Bordrin
 Lichi (car brand)
 Sinogold

References

Electric vehicle manufacturers of China
Car brands
Car manufacturers of China
Chinese brands
2018 establishments in China
Vehicle manufacturing companies established in 2018